Rupert Christopher Soames OBE (born 18 May 1959) is a British businessman, CEO of the outsourcing company Serco.  He is a grandson of Winston Churchill, a nephew of one-time Defence Secretary Duncan Sandys and his wife Diana Churchill, of journalist Randolph Churchill, and of actress and dancer Sarah Churchill. His brother is Conservative Party politician Nicholas Soames, Baron Soames of Fletching.

Early life
Soames was born in Croydon, to Christopher and Mary Soames. He is a grandson of Winston Churchill, a nephew of one-time Defence Secretary Duncan Sandys and his wife Diana Churchill, of journalist Randolph Churchill, and of actress and dancer Sarah Churchill, and is a great-nephew of the founders of the Scout movement, the 1st Baron Baden-Powell and his wife, the Baroness Baden-Powell. His brother is former MP Nicholas Soames, Baron Soames of Fletching.

Education
Soames was educated at St Aubyns School in Rottingdean, East Sussex, and Eton College, and then Worcester College, Oxford, where he studied Politics, Philosophy and Economics (PPE). While at Oxford he worked as a DJ at the London nightclub Annabel's and was a member of the Bullingdon Club, as well as being elected to the Presidency of the Oxford Union and featuring in the Sunday Times 1981 article on Oxford , where Soames described himself as getting "hog-whimperingly drunk".

Career
Upon graduation, he was offered a position at GEC by the managing director Arnold Weinstock. He remained at GEC for 15 years, working in the company's avionics and computing divisions, and became managing director of Avery Berkel, running the company's UK, India, Asia and Africa operations.

After leaving GEC in 1997, Soames joined the software company Misys as chief executive of its Midas-Kapiti division. He was promoted to chief executive of the Banking and Securities Division in June 2000.

Soames left Misys after a disagreement with Misys founder Kevin Lomax on the company's direction, and was appointed chief executive of power hire group Aggreko in June 2003, replacing Philip Harrower, who died when his car collided with a train in the United States. Soames left Aggreko in 2014.

Soames was appointed Officer of the Order of the British Empire (OBE) in the 2010 New Year Honours.

In November 2010, he gave a speech at Holyrood in which he warned, "In the UK, we are already close to the rocks, because, over the next 8 years a third of our coal-fired capacity, two-thirds of our oil-fired capacity, and nearly three-quarters of our nuclear capacity will be closed down either through age or the impact of the European Large Combustion Plant Directive. Absent a massive and immediate programme of building new power stations, with concrete being poured in the next two years, we will be in serious danger of the lights going out."

He is the CEO of Serco.

Personal life
He married Camilla Dunne, daughter of Sir Thomas Dunne, KG, KCVO in 1988. They have three children: Arthur, Daisy, and Jack. Daisy Soames is a god-daughter of Diana, Princess of Wales, and works as a horse safari guide in Kenya. Jack Soames has served as a Page of Honour.

His brother, Nicholas Soames, Baron Soames of Fletching, was a Conservative MP from 1983 until his retirement in 2019. His brother current sits in the House of Lords

References

1959 births
Living people
English chief executives
People educated at St. Aubyns School
People educated at Eton College
Alumni of Worcester College, Oxford
Rupert
Sons of life peers
Officers of the Order of the British Empire
Presidents of the Oxford Union
Serco people
Bullingdon Club members